The Chief Justice of Belize is the head of the Supreme Court of Belize. Under Chapter 7 of the Constitution of Belize, the Chief Justice is appointed by the Governor-General on the advice of the Prime Minister. 

Since the retirement of Kenneth Benjamin in March 2020, Michelle Arana was the acting Chief Justice of Belize.
Louise Blenman was appointed to fill the vacancy in September 2022.

List of Chief Justices

The full list as published by the Attorney General of Belize:

Robert Temple Esq., 1843–1861

British Honduras (1862-1973)

Richard J. Connor, 1862
William Alexander Parker, 1875–1881
Sir Henry Rawlins Pipon Schooles, 1881 (later Administrator of Grenada, 1887 and Attorney General of Jamaica, 1896)
William Anthony Musgrave Sheriff, 1883–1886
Sir William Meigh Goodman, 1886–1889
Sir William John Anderson, 1890–1900 (afterwards Chief Justice of Trinidad and Tobago, 1900)
Sir Walter Llewellyn Lewis, 1900–1906
Frederic Mackenzie Maxwell, 1906–1911 (afterwards Chief Justice of the Leeward Islands, 1912)
Sir Walter Sidney Shaw, 1912–1914
Sir Robert Blair Roden, 1915–1921
Herbert Kortright McDonnell Sisnett, 1922–1931
Charles Wilton Wood Greenidge, 1932–1936
Sir Arthur Kirwan Agar, 1936–1940
Sir Carleton George Langley, 1940–1947
Frederick Malcolm Boland, 1948–1949
Sir Alfred Victor Crane, 1950–1954
Erskine Rueul La Tourette Ward, 1955–1957
Sir Clifford De Lisle Inniss, 1957–1972

Belize (1973–)

Arthur Richard Franklin Dickson, 1973–1974
Sir Denis Eustace Gilbert Malone, 1974–1979
Albert L. Staine, CBE, 1979–1982
George C. R. Moe, QC, 1982–1985
George N. Brown, acting 1985–1986
Taufik Cotran, CBE, 1986–1990
Sir George N. Brown, 1990–1998
George Singh, 1998
Manuel Sosa, CBE, SC, 1998–1999
John Troadio Gonzalez, acting 1999–2000
Dr. Abdulai Osman Conteh, 2000–2010
Samuel Awich, acting 2010–2011
Kenneth Benjamin, 2011-2020
Michelle Arana, acting 2020-2022
Louise Blenman, 2022-Present

References

Belize and the Commonwealth of Nations
 
1843 establishments in the British Empire